The  GER Class C53 was a class of twelve  steam tram locomotives designed by James Holden for the Great Eastern Railway. They passed to the London and North Eastern Railway at the grouping, and received the LNER classification J70.

History
These locomotives had  outside cylinders driving  wheels; all enclosed by skirting. They were the first locomotives on the Great Eastern to use Walschaerts valve gear. They were used on the Wisbech and Upwell Tramway and the ports of Great Yarmouth and Ipswich from the 1930s to the 1950s. They replaced earlier GER Class G15  of similar appearance.

The first withdrawal was in 1942. The remaining locomotives were renumbered 8216–8226 in 1944. The remaining eleven locomotives passed to British Railways in 1948 on nationalisation, and had 60000 added to their numbers. Withdrawals restarted in 1949, slowly at first, then more quickly, and the last went in 1955.

Individual locomotives

Note: The data above is according to RailUK. BRDatabase gives some different dates:
 GER No. 135 was withdrawn in 30 November 1953
 GER No. 136 was withdrawn in 9 March 1953
 GER No. 130 was withdrawn in 23 February 1953
 GER No. 127 was withdrawn in 21 May 1951
 GER No. 128 was withdrawn sometime in January 1955
 GER No. 125 was withdrawn in 24 March 1952
 GER No. 126 was withdrawn in 8 March 1955

In fiction 

J70 68221 was the inspiration for the character Toby the Tram Engine in The Railway Series by the Rev. W. Awdry, and its television series adaptation Thomas & Friends.

References

Notes

Bibliography

Further reading

External links 

  — Great Eastern Railway Society
 The J70 0-6-0 (GER Class C53) Tram Engines — LNER Encyclopedia

C53
0-6-0T locomotives
Railway locomotives introduced in 1903
Tram engines
Scrapped locomotives
Standard gauge steam locomotives of Great Britain